, released in July 1966, is the first film made by Japanese director Kōji Wakamatsu independently of any movie studio. It was released just months after he had left Nikkatsu and formed his own company, Wakamatsu Productions.

Plot summary
A man keeps his girlfriend tied up in his small apartment and tortures her. She is undressed, subjected to various types of bondage, whipped, and tortured with a razor blade. He also brushes her hair, applies make-up on her, and breaks down and cries in the fetal position. In the end the girl gets free and has her revenge.

At the time of its release Wakamatsu was quoted as saying "For me, violence, the body and sex are an integral part of life"

Cast

Notes

References

External links
 IMDb entry

1966 films
BDSM in films
Films directed by Kōji Wakamatsu
Pink films
Japanese black-and-white films
1960s pornographic films
1960s Japanese films